Bene was a town of ancient Crete, in the neighbourhood of Gortyn, to which it was subject, only known as the birthplace of the poet Rhianus.

The site of Bene is tentatively located near modern Kastellos, Panagia.

References

Populated places in ancient Crete
Former populated places in Greece